The 2016 season will be the 36th season of competitive association football in Malaysia.

Promotion and relegation

Pre-season

New and withdrawn teams

New teams 
 DYS F.C. (FAM Cup)
 KDMM F.C. (FAM Cup)
 PKNP F.C. (FAM Cup)
 SAMB FC (FAM Cup)
 MPKB-BRI U-Bes F.C. (FAM Cup)
 PB Melayu Malaysia F.C. (FAM Cup)

Withdrawn team 
 LionsXII (Super League)
 Harimau Muda C (FAM Cup)
 Young Fighters F.C. (FAM Cup)
 Putrajaya SPA F.C. (FAM Cup)
 Shahzan Muda FC (FAM Cup)
 Kedah United F.C. (FAM Cup)
 Real Mulia F.C. (FAM Cup)
 Johor DT III (FAM Cup)
 PBAPP FC (FAM Cup)
 TNB Kilat F.C. (FAM Cup)

National team

Malaysia national football team

2018 FIFA World Cup qualification – AFC second round

2019 AFC Asian Cup qualification

2016 AFF Championship

International Friendlies

Malaysia national under-23 football team

International Friendlies

Malaysia national under-22 football team

2016 Nations Cup

International Friendlies

Malaysia national under-19 football team

2016 AFF U-19 Youth Championship 
 All times are local, ICT (UTC+7).

Malaysia national under-16 football team

2016 AIFF Youth Cup

2016 AFF U-16 Youth Championship

2016 AFC U-16 Championship

International Friendlies

League season

Super League

Premier League

FAM Cup

Group A

Group B

Final

First leg

Second leg

Domestic Cups

Charity Shield

FA Cup

Final

Malaysia Cup

Malaysian clubs in Asia

Johor Darul Ta'zim F.C.

AFC Champions League

Qualifying play-off

AFC Cup

Group stage

Knock-out stage

Selangor FA

AFC Cup

Group stage

Coaching changes

Malaysia national football team

Malaysia Super League

Malaysia Premier League

Notes

References